This is a partial list of software for the Ouya gaming console, from a total of 1250 games as of June 2019.

While the Ouya is based on the Android operating system, without sideloading and/or exploits it can only run games that are offered through its own storefront, which were originally required to have some type of free content, whether being a free cost title, a free demo, or free-to-play with micro-transactions, however this rule was soon removed.

Games

Emulators

Media

Software

Operating systems
Debian and Ubuntu Linux have been installed on the Ouya.

Never released

See also
 Ouya
 List of OnLive video games

References

External links

Ouya